The following page lists all power stations in Burkina Faso.

Hydroelectric

Thermal

Solar

See also 

 List of power stations in Africa
 List of largest power stations in the world
 Energy in Burkina Faso

References 

Burkina Faso
Power stations